Giuseppe Zandemaria (died 1681) was a Roman Catholic prelate who served as Bishop of Piacenza (1654–1681).

Biography
On 9 Nov 1654, Giuseppe Zandemaria was appointed during the papacy of Pope Innocent X as Bishop of Piacenza.
On Jan 1655, he was consecrated bishop by Pietro Vito Ottoboni, Bishop of Brescia. 
He served as Bishop of Piacenza until his death on 6 Apr 1681.

References

External links and additional sources
 (for Chronology of Bishops) 
 (for Chronology of Bishops)  

17th-century Italian Roman Catholic bishops
Bishops appointed by Pope Innocent X
1681 deaths